During the presidency of Jair Bolsonaro (2019-2023), a series of mass deaths, famine, forced displacements and other major human rights violations took place in the Brazilian Yanomami Indigenous Territory. Such events reportedly started or were aggravated from 2019 on as a consequence of rampant exploitation of natural resources by individuals and companies and government neglect, and have been frequently said to constitute a genocide against the Yanomami people.

Background 
After being elected in the 2018 Brazilian general elections and taking office under his pledge to loosen environmental policies, especially in the Brazilian Amazon region, then president Jair Bolsonaro repealed several presidential decrees banning illegal mining and illegal logging nationwide, and effectively dismantled environment protection agencies.

In January 2023, following the end of Bolsonaro's administration due to his defeat in the 2022 Brazilian general elections, new government officials appointed by President Luiz Inácio Lula da Silva took office and immediately were briefed about an escalation of the Yanomami crisis. Over 20,000 illegal miners were estimated to have invaded and exploited the Yanomami reservation, prompting comparisons with the 1980's Serra Pelada gold rush, also in the Amazon.

Incidents 
Government neglect, agricultural encroachment and illegal activities affecting the area precede the creation of the Yanomami reserve in 1992. The first contacts between the Yanomami indigenous peoples and white men scatterly happened between 1910's and 1940's; in the following two decades, such contacts increased due to religious missions based in the region, and road construction works and mining projects conducted by the military regime began in the area in the 1970's, during which the first reports of epidemics especially of flu, measles and whooping cough emerged linked to the decimation of entire Yanomami communities. Ever since, the region has suffered from being a hotspot for illegal activies, notably illegal mining, leading to mercury poisoning of several tribespeople, including infants.

Illegal mining logistics 
A network of politicians, local public servants, farmers, businesspeople and companies was organized to illegally exploit gold and cassiterite as well as to launder the criminal activities in the Yanomami territory. Hidden runaways were built in dozens of nearby and even distant rural properties (as far as in Boa Vista). Some gold extracted has been taken to Venezuela and French Guyana, and refinery facilities and depots have also been used in the scheme.

Additionally, Rodrigo Martins de Mello, a pro-Bolsonaro businessman, was charged with leading another criminal organization operating in the reservation.

On January 16, 2023 Brazilian newspaper Folha de São Paulo reported that Brazilian former army general Augusto Heleno, a former minister under the Bolsonaro government, authorized a convicted drug dealer to run a gold mining project in the Yanomami region. On January 27, Brazilian newspaper O Globo reported that the Brazilian Central Bank failed to crack down on gold laudering. The failure has reportedly emboldened some 20,000 illegal miners to further exploit indigenous territories including the Yanomami reservation.

Legal miner companies such as M.M. Gold (rebranded from Gana Gold) have also masqueraded illegal activies by faking far more-than-permitted amounts of gold to be extracted in their licenses, according to a report by Mongabay and The Intercept Brazil. Cryptocurrencies have been also used to launder criminal activity and transfer financial assets to stooges.

Financing 
On January 24, 2023 two reports by Brazilian newspaper O Globo detailed that the Bolsonaro government allocated BRL 872 million (approximately USD 171 million) from the federal budget for the services of an opaque evangelical non-governmental organisation from 2019 to 2023. According to indigenous leaders in the Yanomami territory the NGO has not worked in the region since it started receiving Bolsonaro administration earmarks, raising suspicions of widespread corruption. Additionally, government funds aimed to transport doctors and nurses to the region during the Bolsonaro administration were directed to transportation companies owned by illegal miners who were also reportedly tipped off about police raids and operations hours or days before they took place.

Communications 
A Brasil de Fato report in February 2023 revealed illegal miners operating in the Yanomami territory had access to Starlink's internet via highly inflated prices in the black market, after Starlink announced in May 2022 it was expanding its coverage to the Amazon region in a project with the Bolsonaro government that aimed to connect among other things 19,000 Brazilian schools in rural areas. As of September 2022, however, only 3 schools in the region had been covered by the Starlink's internet service, while its equipment had been traded among illegal miners since November 2022, with the first Yanomami community only receiving it in late January 2023. Despite Starlink banned devices resales, the company did not contact Brazilian authorities to suspend its service for miners or take any legal action against them.

Internet devices of American company Viasat had also been sold in the black market in the region, and local indigenous leaders said internet access crucially enabled illegal miners to scale up their "productivity".

Health complications 
Medical officials working in the Roraima state where the Yanomami reservation is located have noted a "total lack of proper medical care in the region" adding that malaria-infected indigenous patients have rapidly evolved into severe liver damage after being infected and going untreated multiple times by protozoan Plasmodium falciparum, one of the four species capable of causing malaria in humans. Onchocerciasis, a parasitic disease linked to extreme poverty, has been eradicated in all the Brazilian territory but the Yanomami reservation, where it still represents a disease burden.

Sexual abuse, rape and illegal adoptions 
A report published by Instituto Socioambiental and co-authored by the Hutukara Yanomami and the Wanasseduume Ye'kwana indigenous associations showed testimonies by indigenous women who said illegal miners offered them food or gold in exchange of sex with them and/or their children. Three teenagers aged 13 year-old reportedly died after being raped by illegal miners in 2020. Sexually transmitted infections have also been reported among Yanomami people. Additionally, the federal government opened probes into reports of illegal adoptions and systemic sexual abuse against Yanomami children. As of February 2023, at least 30 girls and teenagers got pregnant due to rapes by miners, according to reports from an indigenous association.

Death toll 
Though estimates of overexploitation-related deaths of the Yanomami people are very scattered and under-reported due to the remoteness of the territory, reports revealed 99 Yanomami children aged 5-year-old or younger died in 2022, of which a third was due to pneumonia, and from 2019 to 2023 a total of 570 Yanomami children died because of malnutrition, hunger and mercury poisoning.

Aftermath 
On January 21, 2023, Brazilian Health Ministry declared a medical emergency in the indigenous territory. On the same day, a trip to the territory located in the northernmost Roraima state was made by Lula and top government officials including the Health minister Nísia Trindade, the Justice minister Flávio Dino and the Indigenous Affairs minister Sônia Guajajara to announce a federal aid package to the region and the Yanomami. On January 24 a field hospital run by the federal government started being set up by the Brazilian military in Roraima's capital Boa Vista and opened three days later. Some 5,000 emergency food kits including meals for indigenous children were sent and distributed into the Yanomami territory.

Investigations 
On January 18, Brazilian leading medical institute Fiocruz warned government officials that a batch of the malaria drug ASMQ meant to treat the disease in the Yanomami people went missing and was reportedly diverted to illegal miners who have since commercialized it.

On January 30, Brazil Supreme Court authorized a probe over the handling of the humanitarian crisis by former Bolsonaro government officials as well as if a genocide has been committed. Investigators were also allowed to gather evidence of the disappearence of illegal aircraft used by miners and seized by the police, and illegal disclosures of police raids to benefit illegal miners, among other actions or lack thereof.

Crackdown 
Simultaneously to the investigations, the federal government announced several measures to have the criminal networks operating in the region disbanded and removed from the Yanomami territory including heavy security and medical staff deployment; food and water supplies and garment items to the affected communities and the (re)opening of the indigenous agency Funai outposts in the region. Additionally, a no-fly zone was estabilished over the territory.

On February 8, Brazilian environment agency Ibama launched a massive operation to retake the Yanomami reservation from criminals which included seizing guns, boats and fuel, and destroying mining equipment, a helicopter and a jet. The agency also set up an outpost in the Uraricoera river to stop new supplies from reaching the illegal miners downstream. 

As of February 6, 42 helicopters and jets were seized and 28 more were already destroyed by the Brazilian Federal Police. On February 15, a joint police, prosecutors and Federal Revenue of Brazil auditors task force had 2 billion BRL (nearly 383,000 USD) frozen from suspects of operating an international smuggling ring that sent some 13 tonnes of illegally-mined gold into Italy, Switzerland, China and the United Arab Emirates.

Escape 
After a blockade of fuel and food supplies feeding criminal organizations and a no-fly zone were announced a significant number of illegal miners reportedly gave up on taking flights and started escaping security forces by land, with some groups trying to cross the border into Venezuela and relatively distant Guyana. Individual flight tickets were reported to be costing 15,000 BRL (nearly 3,000 USD) due to the military siege and those who could not afford taking a flight were either trying to leave the reservation by boat or remained stranded as their food supplies ran out, according to reports and insiders.

See also
 List of scandals in Brazil

References

2019 in Brazilian politics
2020s in Brazilian politics
History of Roraima
Indigenous culture in Brazil
Social history of Brazil